Outskirts (meaning "fringe" or "periphery"), also known in English as The Patriots or by the transliterated Russian title Okraina, is a 1933 Soviet film directed by Boris Barnet.

Plot summary
In a small town in a remote part of the Russian Empire, factory workers struggle to organize against the owners. When World war I comes, they unite as soldiers of the Tsar on the Eastern Front. Local girl Anka forges a relationship with a German POW.  The film criticises war profiteers and encourages workers to reach out to one another across national lines. In 1917, the Tsar is forced to abdicate following the February Revolution.

Cast
Sergey Komarov  — Alexander P. Greshin
Elena Kuzmina  — Anka Greshina
Robert Erdmann  — Robert Karlovich, tenant
Alexander Chistyakov  — Pyotr Kadkin
Nikolay Bogolyubov  — Nikolai Kadkin
Nikolai Kryuchkov — Senka Kadkin
Mikhail Zharov — Kraevich
Hans Klering — Mueller, a German prisoner of war
Alexander Zhukov — policeman
Vladimir Ural — Cabby
Andrew Veit — a German prisoner
Mikhail Yanshin — soldier

References

External links

1933 films
1930s Russian-language films
Films directed by Boris Barnet
Soviet war drama films
World War I films set on the Eastern Front
Soviet black-and-white films
1930s war drama films
1933 drama films
Russian Revolution films